Shanghai Fortress is a 2019 Chinese science fiction action film directed by Teng Huatao and stars Lu Han and Shu Qi. Based on Jiang Nan's eponymous 2009 sci-fi novel (also translated as Once Upon a Time in Shanghai), the film depicts the human race's last stand in Shanghai fighting against aliens who try to seize a hidden energy source on earth in 2042. The film premiered in China on August 9, 2019. It was Godfrey Gao's final film before his death on November 27, 2019.

Cast
 Lu Han as Jiang Yang
 Shu Qi as Lin Lan
 Godfrey Gao as Yang Jiannan
 Shi Liang as Shao Yiyun
 Wang Sen as Pan Hantian
 Wang Gongliang as Zeng Yu
 Sun Jialing as Lu Yiyi

Production
The film is adapted from the 2006 novel of the same name by Jiang Nan.

6 years in production, and about ¥400 million yuan (US $57 million) budget, the film raked in just 119 million yuan in its opening weekend. Lu Han's salary for the film was rumoured to be ¥120 million yuan, however the director Teng Huatao clarified that it was not this high and sources suggested that Lu Han's salary for the film was between 2 - 4 million yuan.

Release
The producer has unveiled the first trailer for the film on February 10, 2019.

The film was released on August 9, 2019, in China.

Reception
Douban, a major Chinese rating site, gave the film a rating of 3.0 out of 10. The film received highly negative reviews in China.

Viewers lamented on Sina Weibo that "it's not a sci-fi film but a half-baked May–December love story between Shu Qi and Lu Han with a few sci-fi elements."  Director Teng Huatao apologized on his social media on Sina Weibo for letting viewers down. Screenwriter and original novel writer Jiang Nan also apologized online, particularly to the fans of his book who were disappointed after waiting so many years for the film. On August 13, 2019, the producer apologized for using original video material from Shawn Wang in promoting the film.

References

External links
 
 
 

2019 films
Chinese science fiction films
Chinese romance films
Films set in Shanghai
Films shot in Shanghai
Films based on Chinese novels
Films based on science fiction novels
2010s Mandarin-language films